A Persian Princess is an oriental-themed Edwardian musical comedy in two acts, with a book by Leedham Bantock and P. J. Barrow, lyrics by Percy Greenbank and music by Sidney Jones, with additional numbers by Marie Horne. It premiered on 27 April 1909 at the Queen's Theatre in London. Despite its experienced and highly regarded cast the show opened to poor reviews and had a short run of 68 performances, closing on 3 July 1909.

Roles and original cast
Princess Yolene (King Khayyam's Daughter) – Ruth Vincent
King Khayyam – George Graves
Zingarie (a Clove Gatherer) – Carrie Moore
Prince Hassan (Son of King Khayyam) – Clarence Blakiston
Prince Omar (Son of King Khayyam) – Noel Fleming
Ujujube (King Khayyam's Favourite Dancer) – Vivienne Tailleur
Selim (a Coffee Bearer) – Master George Burns
The Lady Ayala (The Royal Housekeeper) – Lily Iris
Swaak (The Keeper of the Royal Camels) – Horace Mills
Amm Zad (The Keeper of the Slaves) – John Morley
El Tabloid  (The Court Physician) – Aubrey Fitzgerald
Akbar (The Captain of the Guard) – J. Warren Foster
Mustapha  (The Old Man of the Desert) – Sidney Bracey
Lulu (a Slave Girl) – Beatrice Harrington
Xya-La (a Townswoman) – Isabel Agnew
King Khalifah – M. R. Morand

Chorus of Courtiers, Musicians, Bodyguards, Merchants, Turtle Fishers, Egg Seekers, Ivory Carvers, Guards and Slaves, etc.

Musical numbers

Act I
The Slave Market outside King Khayyam's Palace
1 Opening Number: Mustapha and Girls
2 Trio: Amm Zad, Swaak and Zingarie – "Zingarie" 
3 Song: Omar and Chorus – "When I am King"
4 Duet: Yolene and Omar – "Idle Promises"
5 Entrance: Trio and Chorus –  Khalifah, Zingarie and Swaak – "The King and the Camel"
6 Song: Zingarie and Guards – "The Doggies and the Bone"
7 Song: Yolene and Chorus of Girls – "In the Dark"
8 Song: Swaak and Chorus – "Insomnia" 
9 Quartet: Ayala, Omar, Swaak and El Tabloid – "In the Swim"
10 Chorus and Entrance of Slaves
11 Song: Amm Zad and Chorus – "The Slave Driver"
12 Song: Yolene and Chorus – "Moon Blossom" 
13 Finale

Act II
King Khayyam's Palace
1 Opening Chorus 
2 Duet: Zingarie and Swaak – "A little Coral Island"
3 Duet: Omar and Yolene – "The Mirror of Happiness" 
4 Trio:Khayyam, El Tabloid and Ayala – "The Doctor the Patient and the Nurse"
5 Song: Yolene and Chorus – "The Juniper Tree"
6 Dance: Ujujube
7 Glee: Khayyam, Khalifah, Swaak and Zingarie – "Poor Alfred"
8 Song: Ayala and Girls – "A Cup of Coffee"
9 Song: Omar – "Cupid's Caravan" 
10 Song: Zingarie and Chorus – "Come to Persia"
11 Song: Yolene – "The Land of Heart's Content"
12 Wedding Chorus 
13 Finale

References

1909 compositions
1909 musicals
Original musicals
British musicals